Bjørnsletta was a station on the Kolsås Line (line 6) of the Oslo Metro in Norway. Located between the Åsjordet and Lysakerelven stations in the Ullern borough, Bjørnsletta was—along with Frøen—the only station on the subway network lacking step-free access to the platforms. The station was opened on 15 June 1942 when the line from Sørbyhaugen to Jar had been completed. Along with most of the line, Bjørnsletta was closed for upgrades on 1 July 2006; passenger service was temporarily provided by bus line 43. When the renovation was finished on 17 August 2010, Bjørnsletta and Lysakerelven stations were replaced by a new station, also named Bjørnsletta, placed in between.

References

Oslo Metro stations in Oslo
Railway stations opened in 1942
Railway stations closed in 2006
Disused Oslo Metro stations
1942 establishments in Norway
2006 disestablishments in Norway